Muhammed Sharif or Mohamed Sherif is the name of:

Muhammad Sharif (1919–2008), Pakistani industrialist and father of Prime Minister Nawaz Sharif
Muhammad Shariff (1921–1999), former Chairman Joint Chiefs of Staff Committee (CJCSC) of Military of Pakistan
Mohammad Shariff (born 1920), former Chief of Naval Staff of Pakistan Navy and CJCSC of Pakistani military
Mohammad Sharif (cricketer) (born 1985), Bangladeshi cricketer
Mohammed Sharif, social worker from Uttar Pradesh, India
Mohammed Sharif (detainee), Afghan citizen in extrajudicial detention at Guantanamo Bay Naval Base
Mohammad Sharif (United Nations) (born 1933), former head of the centre for Social Development and Humanitarian Affairs at the United Nations
Muhammad Sharif (cosmologist) (born 1962), Pakistani physicist
Mohammad Sharif Ibrahim, 15th commander of the Royal Brunei Air Force (RBAirF)
Muhammad Sharif Pasha al-Kabir (died 1865), Egyptian statesman
Mohamed Sherif (footballer, born 1993) (born 1994), Egyptian footballer
Mohamed Sherif (footballer, born 1996) (born 1996), Egyptian footballer
Mohamed Sherif Pasha (1826–1887), Egyptian statesman and three time Prime Minister of Egypt